Kevin Smith - The Bionic Man Vol. 1: Some Assembly Required is the unused script created by Kevin Smith.

Plot

Reception

The comic received a mostly positive reception from critics.

References

Bionic franchise
Dynamite Entertainment titles
Comics by Kevin Smith